Tanya Erzen (born 24 June 1972) is an associate professor of Religion and Gender Queer Studies at the University of Puget Sound. She is also an author with four books and has written articles about religion, sexuality, gender and American conservatism. Her book Straight to Jesus: Sexual and Christian Conversions in the Ex-Gay Movement received the Ruth Benedict Prize from the American Anthropological Association and the Gustave O Arlt Award from American Anthropological Association.  

Erzen received a Ph.D. in American Studies from New York University in 2002 and has a B.A. in American Civilization from Brown University (1995). She lives in Seattle and is the Executive Director of the Freedom Education Project Puget Sound (FEPPS), a group providing college classes to women in Washington's prisons and raising awareness about issues educational access and incarceration.

Bibliography
God in Captivity: Redemption and Punishment in America's Faith-Based Prisons by Tanya Erzen, Beacon Press, 2017
Fanpire: The Twilight Saga and the Women Who Love it by Tanya Erzen, Beacon Press, Oct 30, 2012
Straight to Jesus: Sexual and Christian Conversions in the Ex-gay Movement by Tanya Erzen, University of California Press, 2006
Out of Exodus: The Ex-gay Movement and the Transformation of the Christian Right by Tanya Erzen, New York University, Graduate School of Arts and Science, 2002

References

External links
Tanya Erzen's website
Interview with Humanist.com, April 3, 2017

1972 births
Living people
New York University alumni
Brown University alumni
Queer theorists
University of Puget Sound faculty
American religion academics
Gender studies academics